Ovçulu (also, Ovculu, Ovgulu, and Ovchulu) is a village and municipality in the Shamakhi Rayon of Azerbaijan.  It has a population of 1,130.

References 

Populated places in Shamakhi District